The 1991 Cal Poly Mustangs football team represented California Polytechnic State University during the 1991 NCAA Division II football season.

Cal Poly competed in the Western Football Conference (WFC). The Mustangs were led by fifth-year head coach Lyle Setencich and played home games at Mustang Stadium in San Luis Obispo, California. They finished the season with a record of four wins and six losses (4–6, 2–3 WFC). Overall, the team was outscored by its opponents 271–272 for the season.

Schedule

Notes

References

Cal Poly
Cal Poly Mustangs football seasons
Cal Poly Mustangs football